Moirangthem Meghachandra (1 September 1924 – 25 May 2011) was an Indian politician. He was a Member of Parliament, representing Inner Manipur in the Lok Sabha the lower house of India's Parliament. Meghachandra died in Uripok, Imphal West district on 25 May 2011, at the age of 86.

References

External links
 Official biographical sketch in Parliament of India website

1924 births
2011 deaths
Communist Party of India politicians from Manipur
India MPs 1967–1970
Lok Sabha members from Manipur